Tortorella may refer to:

Places
Tortorella, an Italian municipality of the Province of Salerno, Campania
Tortorella Airfield, an Italian abandoned World War II military airfield near Foggia, Apulia

Personalities
Aldo Tortorella, Italian politician
Cino Tortorella, Italian TV presenter
John Tortorella, American ice hockey coach
Nico Tortorella, American actor

See also
Tortora, an Italian municipality of the Province of Cosenza, Calabria
Tortora (disambiguation)

Italian-language surnames
Disambiguation pages with surname-holder lists